The 1991 Ballon d'Or, given to the best football player in Europe as judged by a panel of sports journalists from UEFA member countries, was awarded to Jean-Pierre Papin and published December 24, 1991.

Papin was the third French national to win the award after Raymond Kopa (1958) and Michel Platini (1983, 1984 and 1985). He was also the first player from the French League to win the trophy.

Rankings

References

External links
 France Football Official Ballon d'Or page

1991
1991–92 in European football